In the mathematics of coding theory, the Plotkin bound, named after Morris Plotkin, is a limit (or bound) on the maximum possible number of codewords in binary codes of given length n and given minimum distance d.

Statement of the bound 
A code is considered "binary" if the codewords use symbols from the binary alphabet . In particular, if all codewords have a fixed length n,
then the binary code has length n. Equivalently, in this case the codewords can be considered elements of vector space  over the finite field . Let  be the minimum 
 
The expression  represents the maximum number of possible codewords in a binary code of length  and minimum distance . The Plotkin bound places a limit on this expression.

Theorem (Plotkin bound):

iii) If  is even, then

iv) If  is odd, then

 
where  denotes the floor function.

Proof of case i 
The bound is proved by bounding the quantity  in two different ways.

This means that the 'th column contains  ones. Each choice of a zero and a one in the same column contributes exactly  (because ) to the sum  and therefore

Combining the upper and lower bounds for  that we have just derived,

which given that  is equivalent to

Since  is even, it follows that

This completes the proof of the bound.

See also
 Singleton bound
 Hamming bound
 Elias-Bassalygo bound
 Gilbert-Varshamov bound
 Johnson bound
 Griesmer bound
 Diamond code

References
 

Coding theory
Articles containing proofs